The 2015 East Hampshire District Council election took place on 7 May 2015 to elect members of the East Hampshire District Council in England. It was held on the same day as other local elections. The election saw the Conservatives maintain their majority, whilst the Liberal Democrats, the only other party to hold representation on the council, lost three seats to the Conservatives, all in Whitehill. Three Conservatives and both Liberal Democrats were unopposed in the election, and thus were returned automatically.

Ward Results

Alton Amery

Alton Ashdell

Alton Eastbrooke

Alton Westbrooke

Alton Whitedown

Alton Wooteys

Binsted and Bentley

Bramshott and Liphook

Clanfield and Finchdean

Downland

East Meon

Four Marks and Medstead

Froxfield and Steep

Grayshott

The Hangers and Forest

Headley

Holybourne and Froyle

Horndean Catherington and Lovedean

Horndean Downs

Horndean Hazleton and Blendworth

Horndean Kings

Horndean Murray

Lindford

Liss

Petersfield Bell Hill

Petersfield Causeway

Petersfield Heath

Petersfield Rother

Petersfield St Marys

Petersfield St Peters

Ropley and Tisted

Rowlands Castle

Selborne

Whitehill Chase

Whitehill Deadwater

Whitehill Hogmoor

Whitehill Pinewood

Whitehill Walldown

References

2015 English local elections
May 2015 events in the United Kingdom
2015
2010s in Hampshire